Aquasco is an unincorporated area and census-designated place in southeastern Prince George's County, Maryland, United States, surrounding the town of Eagle Harbor and bordering Charles County. As of the 2020 census, the CDP had a population of 913. Aquasco was home to the Aquasco Speedway.

Geography
Aquasco occupies the southeastern corner of Prince George's County and is centered on the intersection of Maryland Route 381, Aquasco Road, and Maryland Route 233, Dr. Bowen Road. The Patuxent River forms the eastern boundary of the community.

The Aquasco CDP contains the Chalk Point Generating Station and surrounds the tiny incorporated town of Eagle Harbor.

Demographics

2020 census

Note: the US Census treats Hispanic/Latino as an ethnic category. This table excludes Latinos from the racial categories and assigns them to a separate category. Hispanics/Latinos can be of any race.

History
Aquasco is named for a nearby tract first surveyed and patented in 1650.  The name is derived from the Native American name Aquascake.  Located between Swanson's Creek and the Patuxent River, the community developed as an agricultural center for the production of tobacco. The main roads connecting the widely scattered tobacco plantations were established in the 18th century and, in the early 19th century, the village of Woodville began to form.  It was named after the Wood family, early settlers of Aquasco.  By mid-century, the village had a grist mill, several small stores, a tavern, blacksmith, school, post office, and Methodist and Episcopal churches.

Because of the number of plantations, the slave population was relatively high in this section of Prince George's County.  The Freedmen's Bureau established a school at Woodville in 1867.  The school later became home to John Wesley Methodist Episcopal Church. African Americans also worshiped at St. Mary's Episcopal Church, established in 1848 as a mission church of St. Paul's Parish Church, which later became St. Phillip's Episcopal Church.

Historic sites
The following is a list of historic sites in Aquasco identified by the Maryland-National Capital Park and Planning Commission:

Government
Prince George's County Police Department District 5 Station in Clinton CDP serves the community.

The U.S. Postal Service operates the Aquasco Post Office.

Education
Aquasco residents are assigned to schools in Prince George's County Public Schools.

Residential areas of the CDP area are zoned to Baden Elementary School, Gwynn Park Middle School, and Gwynn Park High School.

Notable person
 Leonard Covington, American brigadier general and member of the House of Representatives from Maryland

References

External links
 Villa de Alpacas Farm at Historic Villa De Sales circa 1877, Aquasco, MD
 St. Dominic Catholic Mission Church circa 1879, Aquasco, MD
 Detailed history of St. Dominic Catholic Church in Aquasco, MD
 History of the Aquasco Speedway, 1955

Census-designated places in Maryland
Census-designated places in Prince George's County, Maryland